Turkey took part in the Eurovision Song Contest 2000. The country was represented by Pınar Ayhan and Grup S.O.S. with the song "Yorgunum Anla" written by Pınar Ayhan herself together with Sühan Ayhan and Orkun Yazgan. The entry was chosen by a professional jury. Although the song was originally in Turkish, during the contest it was sung partially in English.

Before Eurovision

23. Eurovision Şarkı Yarışması Türkiye Finali 
The final took place on 18 February 2000 at the Ari TV Studios in Ankara, hosted by Yasemin Pamukçu and Ömer Önder. Ten songs competed and the winner was determined by an expert jury.

At Eurovision
On the night of the contest Pınar Ayhan and Grup S.O.S. performed 22nd in the running order following Latvia and preceding Ireland. At the close of the voting "Yorgunum Anla" had received 59 points, placing Turkey 10th out of 24 competing countries. The Turkish jury awarded its 12 points to Sweden.

Voting

References

2000
Countries in the Eurovision Song Contest 2000
Eurovision